Eugene A. "Gene" Ludwig (born April 11, 1946) is an American business leader and expert on banking regulation, risk management, and fiscal policy. From 1993 to 1998 he served as Comptroller of the Currency.

He is the founder and former CEO and chairman of Promontory Financial Group, a risk management and regulatory compliance consulting firm. Ludwig is currently co-managing partner of the venture capital firm Canapi Ventures and the CEO of Ludwig Advisors. He is also the chairman of Ludwig Institute for Shared Economic Prosperity (LISEP), a non-profit economic research organization. He was also a vice chairman of Bankers Trust and Deutsche Bank.

Early life
Ludwig was born in Brooklyn, New York, to Jacob S. and Louise Rabiner Ludwig and raised in York, Pennsylvania.  His father was a doctor and his mother was a former Broadway chorus girl.

Education
Ludwig received a bachelor's degree from Haverford College in 1968. He studied philosophy at Oxford University. He graduated with a master's of arts degree from New College in  politics and economics. He graduated from Yale Law School with a JD degree. At Yale Law School, he was an editor of the Yale Law Journal and president of Yale Legislative Services.

Legal career
In 1973, Ludwig was hired by the law firm of Covington and Burling and became a partner in 1981.  He specialized in intellectual property law, banking, and international trade. His legal career dealt with the fight against grey market goods.

Comptroller of the Currency
In 1993, Ludwig became the 27th Comptroller of the Currency. Ludwig took office after the early 1990s recession had caused bank failures and created a credit crunch.  During his time in office, the Office of the Comptroller of the Currency took the lead in regulators’ 1993 initiatives to alleviate a lingering credit crunch by encouraging banks to increase lending. Ludwig's agency improved supervision through adoption of "supervision by risk".

Ludwig led President Clinton's initiatives to reform the Community Reinvestment Act and more vigorously enforce the fair lending laws.  In December 1993, Ludwig was singled out by then-Secretary of the Treasury Robert Rubin, who praised “his efforts to make CRA reform a reality."

During five years in office, the Office of the Comptroller of the Currency conducted 4,000 fair lending examinations of national banks. The agency made 25 referrals of fair lending violations to the Department of Justice and the Department of Housing and Urban Development. Previously, there had been only one such referral to a federal agency charged with fair lending enforcement.

As Comptroller, Ludwig served as a member of the Basel Committee on Bank Supervision, a director of the Federal Deposit Insurance Corporation, and a director of the Neighborhood Reinvestment Corporation.

Business career
Ludwig served as vice chairman of Bankers Trust/Deutsche Bank from April 1998 to December 31, 1999. During his time there, he participated in the rescue negotiations for Long-Term Capital Management, a bond-trading hedge fund that was recapitalized under the Federal Reserve’s guidance by 16 leading financial institutions to prevent its collapse.

In 2001, Ludwig founded Promontory Financial Group, becoming its CEO and chairman.  The firm gained attention when, following a $750 million trading scandal at Allied Irish Banks, Promontory produced what became known as "The Ludwig Report," recommending improved compliance and management measures which helped the bank regain its footing. In 2007, after Ludwig advised Countrywide Financial, Portfolio.com wrote that "[Countrywide CEO]
Angelo Mozilo is a tough character, and Ludwig is one of the few people with enough clout to persuade him that the game really was up."

Ludwig is also co-founder and managing partner of Canapi Ventures, a venture capital firm, and founder and CEO of Ludwig Advisors, which advises financial firms on critical matters. Promontory Interfinancial Network, a separate company that Ludwig started in 2003 with former Federal Reserve Vice Chairman Alan Blinder, was sold in 2019 to Blackstone Group.

Publications
Ludwig is the editor of The Vanishing American Dream, a book that provides comments from experts across the political spectrum on the economic challenges facing lower- and middle-income Americans. The book was  the outcome of a 2019 Yale Law School symposium organized by Ludwig. The book examines how traditional economic measures like the unemployment rate and GDP are masking a crisis for millions of lower- and middle-income families, who struggle to afford health care, housing, and education and occupy jobs that cannot help them reverse the downward slide. Kirkus Reviews gave the book a positive review.”

Ludwig has written numerous articles on banking, finance, and economic policy for scholarly journals and publications and has been a guest lecturer at Yale and Harvard law schools and Georgetown University's International Law Institute. Ludwig's works center on the economic challenges confronting lower- and middle-income Americans. He has noted that real-wage stagnation and increases in the costs of education, housing, health care and food, have created a situation where middle-income households  were spending 78% of their budgets on basic needs in 2014.

In 2008, Ludwig co-authored an essay in The Wall Street Journal with former Federal Reserve Chairman Paul A. Volcker and former U.S. Treasury Secretary Nicholas F. Brady calling for a resurrection of the Resolution Trust Corporation to help deal with the financial crisis.

Civic activities and honors
Ludwig is president of The Ludwig Family Foundation Inc., a charitable organization that focuses on improving education, alleviating poverty, and supporting medical research and the arts. In 2019, The Ludwig Family Foundation created The Ludwig Institute for Shared Economic Prosperity, dedicated to improving the economic well-being of lower-income Americans through research and education.

He is a long-time member of the board of directors of the National Academy Foundation, a New York-based nonprofit that helps prepare low- and moderate-income students for college and careers.  Ludwig has also endowed several funds and programs, including the Ludwig Fund for the Humanities at New College, Oxford; the Eugene and Carol Ludwig Center for Community & Economic Development at Yale Law School; and the Ludwig Fund for Community Development at Haverford College.

Ludwig has received numerous awards for excellence and leadership, including the BritishAmerican Business Entrepreneurship Award (2010), National Academy Foundation Leadership Award (2011), Simeon E. Baldwin Award, presented by the Yale Law School Center for the Study of Corporate Law (2011), the Foreign Policy Association Medal (2014), and the Jill Chaifetz Award presented by Advocates for Children (2014.)

He is a Wykeham Fellow at New College, Oxford.

Personal life 
Ludwig lives in Washington, D.C. He is married to Dr. Carol Ludwig, and they have three children. His younger brother Ken Ludwig is a playwright.

References

External links
 
 

United States Comptrollers of the Currency
Comptrollers in the United States
Living people
1946 births
People associated with Covington & Burling
Clinton administration personnel